is a binary trans-Neptunian object from the scattered disc in the outermost regions of the Solar System. It was discovered by Arianna Gleason in 1995 and measures approximately 176 kilometers in diameter. Its 80-kilometer minor-planet moon, provisionally designated , was discovered on 9 November 2002.

Discovery 

 was discovered on 15 October 1995, by American astronomer Arianna Gleason as part of UA's Spacewatch survey at Kitt Peak National Observatory, near Tucson, Arizona.

It was the first of the bodies presently classified as a scattered-disc object (SDO) to be discovered, preceding the SDO prototype  by almost a year.

Satellite 

A companion was discovered by Denise C. Stephens and Keith S. Noll, from observations with the Hubble Space Telescope taken on 9 November 2002, and announced on 5 October 2005. The satellite, designated , is relatively large, having a likely mass of about 10% of the primary.

Scattered–extended object 

 is classified as detached object (scattered–extended) by the Deep Ecliptic Survey, since its orbit appears to be beyond significant gravitational interactions with Neptune's current orbit. However, if Neptune migrated outward, there would have been a period when Neptune had a higher eccentricity.

Simulations made in 2007 show that  appears to have less than a 1% chance of being in a 3:7 resonance with Neptune, but it does execute circulations near this resonance.

Numbering and naming 

This minor planet was numbered by the Minor Planet Center on 20 November 2002. As of 2018, it has not been named.

See also 
 3753 Cruithne (orbital circulations due to near resonant perturbations with Earth)
  – to see a proper 3:7 resonance with Neptune

Notes

References

External links 
 1999 MPEC listing
 2000 MPEC listing
 Asteroid Lightcurve Database (LCDB), query form (info )
 Discovery Circumstances: Numbered Minor Planets (45001)-(50000) – Minor Planet Center
 
 

048639
Discoveries by Arianna E. Gleason
048639
19951015
20021109